Kurdish Dialog Center is an independent organization founded by Rauf Hassan in Sulaymaniyah 1992 after the Kurdish revolution against Saddam Hussein's regime and in time of the civil war among the Kurdish political parties in power.

This organization was motivating people in Iraqi Kurdistan to use dialog, speech, writing and creative critiques instead of weapons and war. It had almost 50 members in its first year and continues to grow day after day.

Most of the members were teachers, writers, poets and artists .

1990s in Iraqi Kurdistan
Organizations established in 1992
Peace organizations based in Iraq